State Highway 79 (SH-79) is a  state highway in southern Jerome, Idaho, United States. It comprises the overpass for South Lincoln Avenue at its interchange with Interstate 84 (I-84) near the southern edge of the city. Until 2007, the highway extended  farther north to downtown Jerome, where it terminated at SH-25.

Route description
SH-79 is wholly located within the diamond interchange for Lincoln Avenue on I-84 (exit 168) in southern Jerome. The highway comprises the four-lane South Lincoln Avenue overpass and portions of the roadway between the interchange's eastbound and westbound ramps.

In 2016, the highway had an average daily traffic volume of 13,490 vehicles.

History
The highway was truncated at the request of the Jerome city government, who accepted maintenance responsibilities and were paid by the state government for future maintenance and rehabilitation work. The Idaho Transportation Board approved the relinquishment of the northern  of SH-79 on May 17, 2007.

Major junctions

See also

References

External links

079
Transportation in Jerome County, Idaho